Shannon Ferry Group (also known as Shannon Ferries) is an Irish private company that operates a ro-ro ferry crossing of the Shannon Estuary between counties Clare and Kerry. The company is based in Killimer Co. Clare, with the service operating between Killimer and Tarbert Co Kerry. It currently operates two ro-ro ferries, Shannon Dolphin and Shannon Breeze. It is the busiest domestic ferry service in Ireland.

Before the introduction of the service the quickest way to travel between the two locations was via Limerick city, a  journey. The service therefore saves hours on the travel time between Kerry and West Clare. It is a popular tourist route as it is the fastest route between the popular tourist destinations of Kerry (i.e. Dingle, Killarney) and north to Clare (i.e. The Cliffs of Moher, The Burren) and Galway (i.e. Galway City, Connemara). The River Shannon is the largest and deepest river in the British Isles, so a bridge would be difficult and costly to build.

The crossing takes about 20 minutes and departures are hourly all year round except Christmas Day, with the frequency doubled in summer. There are toilets on the Tarbert side, and a gift shop, cafe and toilets on the Killimer side.

The service was inaugurated in 1969, with six families based on both sides of the crossing investing to create the company.

Fleet

Shannon Ferry Group has had rour ferries in its history. The service is currently provided by Shannon Dolphin and Shannon Breeze.

References

1969 establishments in Ireland
Ferry companies of the Republic of Ireland
River Shannon